Khuda Bakhsh Oriental Library, in Patna, Bihar, is one of the national libraries of India. It was opened to the public on the 29th of October in 1891 by The Honourable Dr. Justice Sir Khan Bahadur Khuda Bakhsh. Its collection started with 4,000 of Bakhsh's own manuscripts, of which he inherited 1,400 from his father, Sir Mohammed Bakhsh, a lawyer from Patna.

The library has a large collection of Islamic, Sanskrit, Persian, Urdu, Hindi and Kashmiri manuscripts, and art. This includes 35,000 manuscripts (21,000 rare manuscripts and 14,000 small manuscripts), 2,082,904 printed books in Arabic, Persian, Urdu, Turkish, Pushto, Sanskrit, Hindi, Punjabi, English, French, German, Russian, and Japanese. It also curates more than 2,000 paintings made during the Rajput and Mughal eras of India. The library has about 5,000,000 items in total.

It is an autonomous organization under the Ministry of Culture, Government of India, and is governed by a board with the governor of Bihar as its ex officio chairman. Day-to-day responsibility falls to the library director. The library is also a designated Manuscript Conservation Centre (MCC) under the National Mission for Manuscripts.

It is considered to have the best collection of Arabic, Persian, Urdu and Hindi Manuscripts and Literature. It is the 2nd Largest library in the world in term of Islamic literature collection. It is considered to be the most prominent Oriental Public library in the world.

History

The Founder
Following in the footsteps of his father as a collector of manuscripts, HDJ Sir Khan Bahadur Khuda Bakhsh appointed an Arab named Muhammad Maki to acquire books and manuscripts for a monthly income of Rs. 50. Muhammad Makki worked for Bakhsh for 18 years, visiting numerous cities in Egypt, Iran, Syria, and other locations to acquire rare manuscripts. The library opened in 1888 with Bakhsh as the first director until 1895 when he left to serve as Chief Justice of the Supreme Court of Nizam's Kingdom. After a successful career in law in Nizam for almost 3 years, he returned to Patna as the director of the library. Soon after his return, Bakhsh suffered an illness that caused paralysis and his activity was limited to the library. Bakhsh donated the library to the people of India by a deed of trust. Due to his generous donation, he was given Rs.8,000 to liquidate his debt from the Government of Bengal. He was awarded O.I.E in 1903 for his generous act. The library became Bakhsh's life-long achievement to which he was devoted and committed, until his death on the 3rd of August 1908.

History of the library
The library originated in the private collection of a bibliophile, Muhammad Bakhsh Khan, a famous advocate and zamindar of Patna. Muhammad Bakhsh Khan belonged to the House of Bakhsh, a noble family formerly affiliated with the Mughal Empire that still exists today. Before his imprisonment after the 1st war of India's Independence movement, the 1857 rebellion, he inherited about 1,400 manuscripts and 20,000 books from his family who were historically responsible for writing and keeping the records of the Mughal Empire. Muhammad Bakhsh established a private library called Muhammadiyya Library and bequeathed it to his son Khuda Bakhsh in the last days of his life. Muhammad Bakhsh told his son to establish a public library dedicated to the people of India, stating on his death bed, "If you do this, my soul will be at peace." Following his father's will, Khuda Bakhsh spent all his money on expanding the collection and in 1880 had increased the number of manuscripts and books to 4,000. The Bankipur Oriental Library was formally inaugurated by the Governor of Bengal, Sir Charles Alfred Elliott, Governor of Bengal on the 5th of October 1891. During World War 2, the Indian National Army (Azad Hind Fauj) led by Subhas Chandra Bose started attacking British occupied Burma from the Eastern Front. The Indian National Army conducted air raids on the Bengal Presidency to cut the Military logistics support of the British Indian Army. Since the colour of the library's building was red, it was bombed multiple times. Khan Bahadur Abdul Gafoor Khan shifted all the collections of the library to an Underground Bunkers in Patna before they bombings. While the majority of the buildings were destroyed, the collections were safe. After World War 2, the Government of India built multiple new buildings for the library and all the collections were returned. For this generous act of bravery, Abdul Gafoor Khan was awarded the honorary title of "Khan Bahadur". After the partition in 1947, Dr. S.V. Sohoni and Khan Bahadur Abdul Gafoor played a key role to ensure the collections were retained in India. In 1969 through federal legislation the Khuda Bakhsh Oriental Public Library Act, an act of Parliament, the Government of India declared Khuda Bakhsh Oriental Public Library a center of national importance dedicating funding, maintenance, and development of the library. Today it continues to attract scholars from all over the world.

The past directors of the library include the family descendants of Khan Bahadur Khuda Bakhsh as well as renowned historians appointed by the Government of India like Dr. Sachidanand Sinda, Shahabuddin Bakhsh, Salahuddin Bakhsh, Khan Bahadur Abdul Gafoor Khan (son of Khan Bahadur Khuda Bakhsh). When the library was recognized as Institute of National Importance by the Government of India a board committee was established where a new post of a director was created by an act of parliament passed in 1969.  Dr. Abid Reza Bedar, former Director of the Raza Library, became the library 1st director in 1972 and remained there for more than 25 years. Reza Bedar did some important work towards reviving the library along with his successors Dr. Habibur Rehman Chighani and Dr.Imtiaz Ahmed. Since April 2019, the director of the library has been Dr. Shayesta Bedar (daughter of Abid Reza Bedar).

Collection
The Khuda Bakhsh Library consists of a rare collection of the records of the Timurid family, or “history of the Timurid family”, which is not found in any other library or museum around the world. Some of the notable manuscripts include Timur Nama (Khandan--Timuria), Shah Nama, Padshah Nama, Diwan-e-Hafiz and Safinatul Auliya, carrying the autograph of Mughal Emperors and princes, and the book of Military Accounts of Maharaja Ranjit Singh. The library also has specimens of Mughal paintings, calligraphy and book decoration, and Arabic and Urdu manuscripts, including a page of Quran written on deer skin. It has a good collection of rare manuscripts including a page of the Holy Qur'an on parchment in Kufic script belonging to the 9th century AD, in addition to a collection of about forty Sanskrit manuscripts, written on palm leaf.

There are 35,000 manuscripts (21,000 Rare Manuscripts, 14,000 Small Manuscripts) in the library of Arabic, Persian, Urdu, Turkish and Pashto languages.

The library also has a manuscript of Sahih al-Bukhari hand-transcribed by Shaykh Muhammad ibn Yazdan Bakhsh Bengali in Ekdala, eastern Bengal. The manuscript was a gift to the Sultan of Bengal Alauddin Husain Shah.

It has emerged as an notable research library embracing a big range of rare manuscripts. The library's collection includes the best original manuscript known within the international community of the "Tarik-e-Khandan-e-Timuriya". It also contains the writing of Jehangir, the Jahangir Namah written in 1611, with the signature and royal seal of Prince Sultan Muhammad, son of Aurangzeb Alamgir. According to historians, the Mughal emperor Jahangir wrote the 'Jahangir Namah' from his court secretary and gave it as a present to Sultan Muhammad Quli Qutb Shah of Golkonda. However, in 1687, during the reign of Aurangzeb when the Mughals invaded and conquered Golkonda, the Jahangir Nama got into the hands of his son, Prince Sultan Muhammad. The Divān of Hafez from which Emperor Humayun used to solid fortune-tellers all through his stay in Iran is also an adornment of this library. Other records in the collection include a copy of the King's Letter signed by King George V, the entire records of the reign of Mughal Emperor Shah Jahan with 25 stunning images (the remaining picture indicates Shah Jahan's funeral going to the Taj Mahal), and 132 paintings by a docket of well-known artists of Akbar the great. It is also the only library in the world to have the original manuscripts from the Caliphate of Cordoba.

Future 
Khuda Bakhsh Library is on its way to become India's first library to computerize it's handwritten collection for dissemination online. Honoring the desires of Pandit Jawaharlal Nehru which he expressed in the library's visitor book on the 1st of November 1953 writing "I would like to see them reproduced by the contemporary strategies so that others can see them and share this marvelous knowledge".

The library is dedicated to ongoing efforts to accumulate and preserve manuscripts and books, and disseminate widely. Scholarly workshops, symposia, talks, lectures, and seminars are organized to create research-primarily based awareness of expertise both on countrywide and global levels. The library promotes research activities in particular areas which include Islamic studies, Arabic, Persian and Urdu Literature, Comparative Religion, Tibb or Unani medicinal drug, Tasawwuf of Mysticism, history of the Islamic land, Medieval Indian history and culture and the country wide movement. On a larger scale, the library has been publishing its rarities, research, and work in digital platforms. A quarterly research magazine is also being published.

Khuda Bakhsh Library is one of the richest repositories of the intellectual and cultural heritage of South and Central Asia. At the same time it is a major center for dissemination of knowledge all over the world. Indeed, the library has a glorious past, a splendid present and a brilliant future.

See also

 Sinha Library

References

Further reading

 Salahuddin Khuda Bakhsh and Sir Jadunath Sarkar. Khuda Bakhsh. Patna, 1981.

External links
 
 Official Publication Website 

1891 establishments in India
Libraries in Patna
Research libraries
Education in Patna
Tourist attractions in Patna
Buildings and structures in Patna
Museums in Patna
Deposit libraries
Libraries established in 1891
Library buildings completed in 1891